Prosper Ahiabu Deyegbe (born 10 May 1999) is a Ghanaian footballer who plays as a midfielder for Finnish club VPS.

Career 
Ahiabu started his career with West African Football Academy in January 2018. He later joined Liberty Professionals in February 2021.

On 31 March 2022, Ahiabu signed with VPS in Finland.

References

External links 
 
 

 

1999 births
Living people
Ghanaian footballers
Association football midfielders
West African Football Academy players
Liberty Professionals F.C. players
AS Soliman players
Vaasan Palloseura players
Ghana Premier League players
Tunisian Ligue Professionnelle 1 players
Veikkausliiga players
Ghanaian expatriate footballers
Expatriate footballers in Tunisia
Ghanaian expatriate sportspeople in Tunisia
Expatriate footballers in Finland
Ghanaian expatriate sportspeople in Finland